Wiebke is a feminine German given name. Notable people with the name include:

Wiebke von Carolsfeld (born 1966), German-Canadian film director and editor
Wiebke Drenckhan (born 1977), German physicist 
Wiebke Eden (born 1968), German writer
Wiebke Esdar (born 1984), German psychologist and politician
Wiebke Kethorn (born 1985), German handball player
Wiebke Lehmkuhl (born 1983), German opera singer
Wiebke Nulle (born 1980), German archer
Wiebke Muhsal (born 1986), German politician 

German feminine given names